Rachael Wooding (born 27th September 1979) is an English, Yorkshire born musical theatre performer, best known for her performances in We Will Rock You, playing Meat and Scaramouche. She began her career in musicals in Germany – such as Cats and Starlight Express. After West End success in Saturday Night Fever and Fame, she went on to  play Amber in the original London cast of Hairspray the Musical. Wooding left Hairspray in October 2008. She then performed the title role in Evita the Musical on the UK tour.

From March 2011, she featured as Mary Delgado in the West End production of Jersey Boys, before leaving the cast after a year to concentrate on other projects; sometimes as a singer in function band Bloomfield Avenue. In October 2012 she returned to We Will Rock You to play principal Scaramouche alongside Oliver Tompsett as Galileo.

Wooding is a 5' 4" mezzo-soprano. She appeared on Britain's Got Talent in 2016. For her audition, she sang "With You" from Ghost the Musical and in the semi-final she sang "Gravity". Her semi-final performance led her to receiving fourth in the public vote and ultimately, being eliminated from the competition.

Career 
Wooding trained at the Bird College of performing arts, and has been in musicals from a young age.

Her TV roles include:
 Coronation Street, 2008 (as Beautician) and 2011 (as Mandy)
 Doctors, 2015 (as Shawna Roper)
 Girlfriends, 2018 (as Desk Air Steward)

Her musical roles include:

References

External links 
 Rachael Wooding's artist profile
 

English musical theatre actresses
Britain's Got Talent contestants
Actresses from Yorkshire
Living people
1979 births